Jack Hearne may refer to:

J. T. Hearne (1867–1944), English Test cricketer
J. W. Hearne (1891–1965), English Test cricketer

See also:
John Hearne (disambiguation)